Megachile iranica is a species of bee in the family Megachilidae. It was described by Rebmann in 1970.

References

Iranica
Insects described in 1970